The  is a high-speed shinkansen railway line connecting Tokyo and Niigata, Japan, via the Tōhoku Shinkansen, operated by the East Japan Railway Company (JR East). Despite its name, the line does not pass through the city of Jōetsu or the historical Jōetsu region, which instead are served by the Hokuriku Shinkansen. The name instead originates from the parallel Jōetsu Line, which in turn is named after the two provinces that it connects: Jōshū (an alternate name for Kōzuke Province which comprises today's Gunma Prefecture), and Echigo Province (modern day Niigata Prefecture).

Train services
 Toki, Tokyo - Niigata (limited-stop)
 Tanigawa, Tokyo - Echigo-Yuzawa (all-stations, since October 1997)

Discontinued services
 Asahi, Tokyo - Niigata (discontinued December 2002)
 Max Asahi, Tokyo - Niigata (discontinued December 2002)
 Max Toki, Tokyo - Niigata (discontinued October 2021)
 Max Tanigawa, Tokyo - Echigo-Yuzawa (discontinued October 2021)

Stations
Legend:

The Gala-Yuzawa Line is a  branch from Echigo-Yuzawa to Gala-Yuzawa Station. It operates in the winter months only, serving the adjoining ski resort.

Like all Shinkansen lines, the Jōetsu Shinkansen is standard gauge.

Rolling stock
 the following train types operate on Jōetsu Shinkansen services.
 E7 series: Toki / Tanigawa (since 3 March 2019)

Additional sets were gradually introduced through 2023 for the replacement of E2 series trains.

Former rolling stock
 200 series: Toki / Tanigawa (until March 2013)
 E1 series: Max Asahi / Max Toki / Max Tanigawa (until September 2012)
 E2 series: Toki / Tanigawa (January 2013 until March 2023)
 E4 series: Max Toki / Max Tanigawa (until October 2021)

History
The program to build the new line was initiated in 1971 by Niigata-born prime minister Tanaka Kakuei; one popular anecdote is that Tanaka determined the line's routing by drawing it on a map with a red pencil. Built at a cost of $6.3 billion, it was built "to establish closer ties with Tokyo and promote regional development".

Trial runs over the line began in November 1980, and regular service began on 15 November 1982.

The Basic Plan specifies that the Jōetsu Shinkansen should actually start from Shinjuku, which would necessitate building  of additional Shinkansen track from Ōmiya. While some land acquisitions along the existing Saikyō Line were made, no construction ever started.

Upgrades included improvements to the soundproofing system. As a result of the upgrades, all trainsets on the Jōetsu Shinkansen operate exclusively with E7 series trainsets and the travel time on the line is projected to be reduced by 7 minutes compared to the former E2 and E4 series trainsets. The end of E2 series trainsets on Jōetsu Shinkansen services took take place on 17 March 2023 with the streamlining of all services to use the E7 series taking place the following day.

Future plans 
The Niigata prefectural government has proposed building a new multi-modal terminal to directly connect the Shinkansen to the port of Niigata, potentially allowing direct transfers to ferries and cruise ships, and to potentially allow direct access between the Shinkansen and Niigata Airport. However this plan is foreseen to be completed only by the mid-2040s.

Special event train services
On 17 November 2012, a special  service ran as Toki 395 from Omiya to Niigata using 10-car 200 series set K47.

Also on 17 November 2012, a special  service ran from Niigata to Tokyo using E5 series set U8, with a special ceremony at Niigata Station before departure. This was the first revenue-earning service operated on the Joetsu Shinkansen by an E5 series trainset.

See also
2004 Derailment of Joetsu Shinkansen

References

External links

 JR East website 

 
Lines of East Japan Railway Company
High-speed railway lines in Japan
Railway lines opened in 1982
Standard gauge railways in Japan
1982 establishments in Japan
25 kV AC railway electrification